Obscure Alternatives is the second studio album by English new wave band Japan, released in October 1978 by record label Hansa.

Background 

Japan's first album, Adolescent Sex, had been unsuccessful on the British charts, and their record company required another album, this time aimed at the lucrative US and European markets where rock was dominating the airwaves. Still working with Ray Singer as producer, singer and songwriter David Sylvian in particular found it difficult to take a back seat and began to demand more control over the eventual presentation of the material.

Content 

Trouser Press wrote that the album "adds more keyboards but still relies on Rob Dean's buzzing guitars and David Sylvian's sneery vocals for its sound". Certain tracks contain elements of funk and reggae. AllMusic's Amy Hanson described "Automatic Gun" as "a spit-shined punk shocker backed by bright pop guitar". The title track is described as "wonderfully atmospheric and slightly menacing", while "Love Is Infectious" "put the band completely into discordant post-punk art house-dom". "....Rhodesia", Hanson writes, "brought the funk back and infused it with a Caribbean essence.

The final track, "The Tenant", a piano based instrumental, was the first notable shift towards the direction their later material would take. "The Tenant" also marks bassist Mick Karn's recording debut on saxophone.

Release 

Obscure Alternatives was released in October 1978, only seven months after Adolescent Sex. As with the first album, Obscure Alternatives was commercially unsuccessful in the UK, but garnered moderate success in Japan, where it peaked just outside the Top 20.

The tracks "Deviation" and "Sometimes I Feel So Low" were released as singles in certain countries, the latter as a double A-side with a re-recorded version of "Adolescent Sex" (the title track of their first album, re-recorded during the sessions for this album). It became Japan's first European hit single, and the re-recorded version of "Adolescent Sex" is featured on the 1981 compilation album Assemblage. Both tracks were mixed together to form "I Can't Wait", which was club hit for L'il Devious in 2003.

The album was remastered and re-released in 2004, and included a video for "Sometimes I Feel So Low".

Reception 

Trouser Press' review was unfavourable, writing: "The songs are fairly unmelodic, the production nondescript. With a quick listen, you might mistake this for a junior-league Stones imitation."

AllMusic was more positive, writing retrospectively: "Although the set isn't quite up to par with its predecessor, Obscure Alternatives is still a challenging listen."

Sylvian has gone on record saying that Obscure Alternatives would have been a better debut album than Adolescent Sex was.

Track listing

Personnel 

 Japan
David Sylvian – lead vocals, guitar, mixing
Rob Dean – guitar, backing vocals, mixing
Richard Barbieri – synthesizer, keyboards, mixing
Mick Karn – bass, backing vocals, saxophone, mixing
Steve Jansen – drums, backing vocals, percussion, mixing

 Additional personnel
 Ray Singer – production, mixing
 Chris Tsangarides – engineer, mixing
 Ian Cooper – mastering
 Fin Costello – sleeve photography

Charts

References

External links 
 

Japan (band) albums
1978 albums
Hansa Records albums